The Law Reform (Year and a Day Rule) Act 1996 is a short Act of Parliament which abolished the year and a day rule in English law and Northern Irish law.
The year and a day rule was an ancient rule of the common law which created a conclusive presumption that a death was not murder (or any other form of homicide) if it occurred more than a year and a day since the act (or omission) that was alleged to have been its cause.  The precise scope of the rule was unclear.  As Lord Dormand said on second reading in the House of Lords, "it certainly applies to murder, manslaughter, infanticide and aiding and abetting suicide. It may also apply to motoring offences in which death is an element: causing death by dangerous driving; causing death by reckless driving while under the influence of drink or drugs; and aggravated vehicle taking causing death."

The Act has only three sections.  Section 1 simply says:

The rule known as the "year and a day rule" (that is, the rule that, for the purposes of offences involving death and of suicide, an act or omission is conclusively presumed not to have caused a person's death if more than a year and a day elapsed before he died) is abolished for all purposes.

The remaining two sections provide that a prosecution where a death occurs more than three years after an injury, or where the accused was previously convicted of an offence committed in circumstances connected with the death (for example, a previous conviction for grievous bodily harm), can be instituted only with the consent of the Attorney General.

The Act started as a private member's bill introduced by Doug Hoyle MP, who came 16th in the ballot in the 1995/6 Parliamentary session. The Act received Royal Assent on 17 June 1996, and the abolition of the year and a day rule came into effect for acts (or omissions) leading to death on that day.

References

External links
Year and a Day Rule in Homicide | Law Commission

Acts of the Parliament of the United Kingdom concerning England and Wales
United Kingdom Acts of Parliament 1996
Acts of the Parliament of the United Kingdom concerning Northern Ireland
Law reform in the United Kingdom